Tempi may refer to:

 Tempo, plural tempi, the speed of a musical piece
 Tempi (municipality), a municipality in Larissa, Thessaly, Greece
 TEMPI syndrome, a novel orphan disease

See also 
 Palazzo Tempi, a palace in Florence, Tuscany, Italy
 Tempo (disambiguation), other uses of tempo, some of which may be pluralised to tempi
 Tempy, a locality in Victoria, Australia